Leif Peter Skoog (born 11 February 1965) is a Swedish former footballer. He made 86 Allsvenskan appearances for Djurgårdens IF and scored 22 goals.

References

Swedish footballers
Djurgårdens IF Fotboll players
1965 births
Living people
Sundbybergs IK players
Association football forwards